Isaac Boakye (born 1981) is a Ghanaian former professional footballer.

Isaac Boakye may also refer to:
 Isaac Boakye (footballer, born 1997), Ghanaian footballer
 Isaac Boakye (footballer, born 1984), Ghanaian footballer